Valeri Bukrejev (born June 15, 1964 in Tallinn) is a retired Estonian pole vaulter.

He finished seventh at the 1993 World Championships, eighth at the 1994 European Indoor Championships in a new Estonian indoor record of 5.60 metres and fourth at the 1994 Goodwill Games. He renewed Estonian indoor record in March 1995 in Kuopio, which is also the current Estonian indoor record.

His personal best is 5.86 metres, achieved in July 1994 in Somero. This is the current Estonian record.

References

Profile on Sports-reference.com

1964 births
Living people
Athletes from Tallinn
Estonian male pole vaulters
Athletes (track and field) at the 1992 Summer Olympics
Athletes (track and field) at the 1996 Summer Olympics
Olympic athletes of Estonia
Estonian people of Russian descent
World Athletics Championships athletes for Estonia
Competitors at the 1994 Goodwill Games